Günthör is a surname. Notable people with the surname include:

 Werner Günthör (born 1961), Swiss track and field athlete
 Max Günthör (born 1985), German volleyball player